The following is a timeline of the history of the city of Miami in Miami-Dade County, Florida, United States.

19th century

 1870 – William Brickell establishes a trading post on the south side of the Miami River.
 1880 – Population: county 100.
 1884 – The first hotel, The Peacock Inn, is established in Coconut Grove.
 1886 
 Ralph Munroe builds a home on the bay in Coconut Grove.
 Kirk Munroe establishes a home in Coconut Grove. 
 1889 – Teaching begins in the first school building in Coconut Grove.
 1891 – Julia Tuttle moves to Miami.
 1895 – The first public library is established in Coconut Grove by the ladies of the Pine Needles Club.
 1896
 Miami incorporated; John B. Reilly becomes mayor.
 Florida East Coast Railway (Jacksonville-Miami) arrives in Miami.
 Miami Metropolis newspaper begins publication.
 Biscayne Hotel built.
 1897
 Royal Palm Hotel in business.
 City of Miami Cemetery established.
 1898 
 Burdines in business.
 David Fairchild establishes the USDA Plant Introduction Garden.
 1899
Dade County seat relocated to Miami from Juno.
Telephone service begins in Miami.
 1900
 Flagler Public Library, Miami Board of Trade, and Woman's Club founded.
 Population: 1,681.

20th century

1900s-1940s
 1902 – Carpenters Local 993 labor union established.
 1903 
 John Sewell becomes mayor.
 Ransom Everglades School is established in Coconut Grove.
 The Miami Herald newspaper begins publication.
 1906
 Streetcars begin operating.
 Automobile parade.
 1909
 City Hall built.
 Lummus Park opens.
 1910 – Population: 5,471; county 11,933.
 1912 – Airport established near Miami.
 1913
 Bridge to Miami Beach constructed.
 Lyric Theater opens.
 1914 – Construction of Vizcaya begins.
 1915
 Miami Chamber of Commerce established.
 Town of Miami Beach incorporated near Miami.
 1916 – David Fairchild establishes The Kampong, his winter home in Coconut Grove.
 1917 – Elser Pier opens.
 1918 – Airdrome Theatre and Strand Theatre open. 
 1919 
 Coconut Grove is incorporated.
 Great Miami Employers' Association established.
 Seybold Canal Bridge built (approximate date).
 1920
 Universal Negro Improvement Association chapter established.
 Population: 29,549; county 42,753.

 1921
 Commission-manager form of government adopted.
 WQAM radio begins broadcasting.
 Tamiami Canal Bridge built.
 1923 – Miami Times newspaper begins publication.
 1924
 Buena Vista becomes part of Miami.
 Miami River Canal Swing Bridge built.
 Fotosho Theatre opens.
 1925
 Allapattah, Coconut Grove, Lemon City, Silver Bluff, and West Little River become part of Miami.
 Bayfront Park opens.
 Towns of Coral Gables and Hialeah incorporated near Miami.
 University of Miami established in Coral Gables.
 1926
 January 10: Prinz Valdemar ship sinks offshore.
 September: Hurricane.
 WIOD radio begins broadcasting.
 Player's State Theater built.
 Booker T. Washington High School, Olympia Theater, and Tower Theater open.
 Town of Miami Shores incorporated near Miami.
 Wometco – first movie theater, the Capital, opens.
 1927
 Flagler Theater opens.
 E. G. Sewell becomes mayor.
 Greater Bethel African Methodist Episcopal Church built.
 Jewish Floridian newspaper begins publication.
 1928
 Pan American Field (airfield) begins operating.
 Dade County Agricultural High school built.
 Al Capone buys a home in Miami Beach.
 1929 - Sears, Roebuck and Company Department Store opens.
 1930
 Miami Civic Center opens.
 Population: 110,637.
 1933
 February 15: Chicago mayor Anton Cermak killed by anarchist in Bayfront Park.
 E. G. Sewell becomes mayor again.
 Ryder, the truck leasing company, founded in Miami.
 1935
 January 1: Orange Bowl football contest begins.
 November: Hurricane.
 1936 – Parrot Jungle established.
 1937 – Burdine Stadium, and Liberty Square (housing complex) open.
 1938 – Fairchild Tropical Botanic Garden opens to the public.
 1939 – E. G. Sewell becomes mayor yet again.
 1940
 Historical Association of Southern Florida established.
 Population: 172,172; county 267,739.
 1941 – Dorsey Memorial Library opens.
 1942
 May: Portero del Llano ship sinks offshore during World War II.
 Submarine Chaser Training Center established.
 1943 – Urban League of Greater Miami established.
 1946 – National Association for the Advancement of Colored People branch established in Liberty City.
 1948 – Coconut Grove Citizens Committee for Slum Clearance and Civil Rights Congress chapter organized.
 1949 – WTVJ (television) begins broadcasting.

1950s-1970s
 1950 – Population: 249,276; county 495,084.
 1952 – Museum of Science and Natural History opens on Bayshore Drive.
 1953 
 Diario Las Américas Spanish-language newspaper begins publication.
 Howard Hughes Medical Institute founded in Miami.
 1954 – Burger King founded in Miami.
 1955 – Miami Seaquarium established.
 1956 – WCKT (television) begins broadcasting.
 1957
 WPST-TV (television) begins broadcasting.
 DuPont Plaza Hotel opens for business.
 Robert King High elected mayor of Miami.
 1958 – Catholic Diocese of Miami established.
 1959
 City public schools racially desegregated.
 Dade County Junior College and Centro Hispano Católico founded.
 Miami International Airport dedicated.
 1960 – Population: 291,688; county 935,047.
 1961 – Colegio de Belén relocates to Miami from Cuba.
 1962 – Historical Museum of Southern Florida and Cruzada Educativa Cubana established.
 1964 
 February 25. Cassius Clay defeats Sonny Liston for heavyweight champion of the world.
 Chuck Hall becomes mayor of Dade County.
 1965
 Cuban exiles begin to arrive in city via U.S.-sponsored "freedom flights".
 Florida International University established.
 Ediciones Universal in business.
 1966 The Miami Dolphins enter the American Football League as an expansion franchise
 1968
 August 5–8: 1968 Republican National Convention held in nearby Miami Beach.
 August 7–8: 1968 Miami riot.
 Miami Pop Festivals held near city in May and December.
 1970
 David T. Kennedy becomes mayor of city; Stephen P. Clark becomes mayor of Dade County.
 Population: 334,859; county 1,267,792.
 1971 – Latin Chamber of Commerce established.
 1972
 July: 1972 Democratic National Convention is held in nearby Miami Beach.
 August: 1972 Republican National Convention is also held in Miami Beach.
 September: Florida International University opens.
 One Biscayne Tower is built.
 Miami Dolphins have their undefeated "perfect" season.
 Jack Orr becomes mayor of Dade County.
 November: "Decade of Progress" bond is passed, providing the funding for the Center for the Fine Arts.
 1973
 April: U.S.-sponsored "freedom flight" arrivals to Miami of Cuban exiles ends.
 Barnacle Historic State Park established.
 Maurice Ferre becomes city mayor.
 1974
 Stephen P. Clark becomes mayor of Dade County again.
 Spanish American League Against Discrimination headquartered in city.
 1975
 The Bee Gees move to Miami Beach.
 1976
 El Miami Herald Spanish-language newspaper begins publication.
 Bicentennial Park opens.
 1977
 Foreign trade zone established.
 Black Archives History & Research Foundation of South Florida headquartered in city.
 Omni International Mall in business.

1980s-1990s
 1980
 May: race riots in Overtown and Liberty City after the death of Arthur McDuffie.
 April–October: Cubans arrive in city via Mariel boatlift.
 Miami MetroZoo opens near city.
 Population: 346,865;
 1981
 Palace apartment building constructed.
 Cuban American National Foundation headquartered in city.
 1982
 Knight International Center (convention center) opens.
 Facts About Cuban Exiles organization established.
 1982 Overtown riot occurs
 1983 
 The movie Scarface is filmed in Miami.
 Christo unveils Surrounded Islands.
 1984
 Metrorail begins operating.
 Center for Fine Arts 
 Miami International Film Festival begins.
 Southeast Financial Center built on Biscayne Boulevard.
 Fictional Miami Vice television program begins national broadcast founded and ran on NBC from 1984 to 1989. 
 First edition of the Miami International Book Fair.
 First year of filming
 1985
 Miami SunPost newspaper begins publication.
 Xavier Suarez becomes city mayor.
 Stephen P. Clark Government Center built.
 The Golden Girls, a television sitcom, begins its seven-year run.
 Miami City Ballet debuts.
 1986 – Lincoln Center built.
 1987
 November: Pope John Paul II visits city.
 Miami New Times newspaper in publication.
 Miami Tower built.
 1989
 Nelson Mandela visits city.
 Ileana Ros-Lehtinen becomes U.S. representative for Florida's 18th congressional district.
 1990
 Knight Foundation headquartered in city.
 Population: 358,548; county 1,937,094.
 1992 – August: Hurricane Andrew.
 1993
 Stephen P. Clark becomes city mayor.
 Carrie P. Meek becomes U.S. representative for Florida's 17th congressional district.
 1994
 Eleventh Street (Metromover station) opens.
 1st Summit of the Americas held in city.
 1996
 Willy Gort becomes mayor of city, succeeded by Joe Carollo; Alex Penelas becomes mayor of Dade County.
 City website online (approximate date).
 Pottinger v. City of Miami homeless-related lawsuit decided.
 Liberty City Charter School established.
 1997
 May 12: Tornado.
 November: Mayoral election held.
 Dade County renamed Miami-Dade County.
 1998
 January: Xavier Suarez becomes mayor again.
 March: Mayoral election results of 1997 judged invalid; Carollo becomes mayor again.
 1999
 American Airlines Arena opens.
 Ultra Festival begins.

2000s
 2000
 Elián González affair.
 Population: 362,470; county 2,253,362.
 Town of Miami Lakes incorporated near Miami.

21st century

2000s
 2001
 Cuban Genealogy Club of Miami founded.
 Manny Diaz becomes city mayor.
 2002 – Art Basel begins in Miami Beach.
 2003
 Four Seasons Hotel Miami built.
 City of Miami Gardens incorporated near Miami.
 2004 – Carlos Alvarez becomes mayor of Miami-Dade County.
 2006 – Carnival Center opens.
 2007
 Ferguson U.S. Courthouse built.
 Fictional Burn Notice television series begins its seven-year run.
 2008 – Marquis Residences and 900 Biscayne Bay built on Biscayne Boulevard.
 2009 – Tomás Regalado becomes city mayor.

2010s
 2010
 Port of Miami Tunnel construction begins.
 Population: 399,457; county 2,496,435; metro 5,564,635.
 2011
 Carlos A. Giménez becomes mayor of Miami-Dade County.
 Vice City Rollers (roller derby league) formed.
 Frederica Wilson becomes U.S. representative for Florida's 17th congressional district.
 2015
 Marco Rubio presidential campaign, 2016 headquartered in Miami.
 The Miami Science Museum's Coconut Grove location closes
 2017 
 January: City revises its illegal-immigrant sanctuary policy.
 The new Miami Science Museum's location opens

See also
 History of Miami
 List of mayors of Miami
 National Register of Historic Places listings in Miami, Florida
 Government of Miami-Dade County
 Timelines of other cities in the South Florida area of Florida: Boca Raton, Fort Lauderdale, Hialeah, Hollywood, Miami Beach, West Palm Beach

References

Bibliography

Published in the 20th century

1900s-1940s 
 Miami City Directory (Miami, Florida, 1904)
 
 1918 ed.
 
 
 1920 ed.
  map
 
 
 
 Isador Cohen, Historical Sketches and Sidelights of Miami (Miami, 1925)

 T. H. Weigall, Boom in Paradise (New York, 1932)
 
 
 
   1941-

1950s-1970s
 Helen Muir, Miami, U. S. A. (New York, 1953)
 Ruby Leach Carson, "Miami: 1896 to 1900", Tequesta, XVI (1956)
 
 Paul S. George, "Colored Town: Miami's Black Community, 1896–1930", Florida Historical Quarterly (April 1978)

1980s-1990s
 Paul George, "Passage to a New Eden", Florida Historical Quarterly, 59 (1981)
 
 
 
 
 
 Arva Moore Parks. Miami: The magic city. Miami: Centennial Press, 1991.
 
 
  (Abstract)
  (fulltext)
 
 
 
 Marvin Dunn, Black Miami in the Twentieth Century (Gainesville, Florida, 1997)

Published in the 21st century

External links

 Digital Public Library of America. Items related to Miami, various dates
 
 City and Local Maps for Miami-Dade County
 

 
miami
Miami-related lists